Davis M. Heppenstall (born September 8, 1993), better known by the stage name Naomi Smalls, is an American drag queen and reality television personality, best known as one of the runners-up on the eighth season of RuPaul's Drag Race as well as RuPaul's Drag Race All Stars season 4.

Early life 
Heppenstall was born on September 8, 1993 in Fresno, California and was later adopted in Redlands. He has eight brothers and three sisters, many of whom were also adopted.

Career 

The name Naomi Smalls comes from supermodel Naomi Campbell and rapper Biggie Smalls.

RuPaul's Drag Race
Smalls was announced as one of twelve contestants for the eighth season of RuPaul's Drag Race on February 1, 2016. At 21 years old, she was the season's youngest contestant. Smalls was in the bottom two in the fifth episode after she played Tiffany Pollard for the annual "Snatch Game" competition. She lip synced to "Causing a Commotion" by Madonna against Acid Betty and won, saving herself from elimination. She won the makeover challenge the following episode, where she designed an outfit for one of the Little Women: LA cast members. She reached the final three in the season, but lost to Bob the Drag Queen, and tied with Kim Chi for runner-up.

On November 8, 2018, it was announced that Smalls would be returning to compete in the fourth season of RuPaul's Drag Race All Stars. Smalls placed high for the first four episodes, doing incredibly well but just shy of winning. She was in the bottom for the roast of Lady Bunny in episode five but won against Gia Gunn in a Lipsync in the episode six "LaLaPaRuZa" to keep her place. She was in the bottom the following episode, but was saved by Latrice Royale. She won the makeover challenge, becoming the first ever queen to win two makeover challenges, and the only one to only win the makeover challenge on each of her seasons, but she controversially eliminated front-runner Manila Luzon from the competition after Luzon had been the only queen that season to never previously land in the bottom two. Smalls reached the final, and finished as the Runner up with Monique Heart. She became the first Drag Race contestant to finish as Runner up to both of her seasons since Raven.

After Drag Race
Outside of Drag Race, Smalls was a co-host with Kim Chi for the WoWPresents internet series M.U.G. where they critique queens makeup looks. She makes recurring appearances on the internet series "Fashion Photo Ruview" filling in for Raja or Raven.

Smalls did an interview with Cardi B for Cosmopolitan in February 2018.

She started her own YouTube series, Small's World, where she documents her life touring across the country. The first episode premiered on February 16, 2018.

In September 2019, at RuPaul’s DragCon NYC, Smalls was named as one of a rotating cast of a dozen Drag Race queens in RuPaul's Drag Race Live!, a Las Vegas show residency at the Flamingo Las Vegas.

She is one of the most followed queens from Drag Race, and has accumulated over 1.6 million Instagram followers as of October, 2021.

Music 
Smalls released a music video for her first single, "Pose", on December 16, 2018.

She also appeared in Manila Luzon’s music video for "Go Fish".

Filmography

Film

Television

Music videos

Web series

Discography

Singles

References

External links
 

Living people
American drag queens
Gay models
American gay musicians
LGBT people from California
People from Redlands, California
Naomi Smalls
Naomi Smalls
African-American drag queens
American LGBT singers
21st-century African-American women singers
1993 births